Cho Seung-hee (born June 3, 1991), better known as Cho Yi-hyun, is a South Korean actress, singer, general producer of the label company PocketDol Studio and founder of PocketDol Studio's label M25. She debuted as new member of F-ve Dolls in 2013 and continued to promote until the group unofficially disbanded in November 2014, which was confirmed in March 2015. Following the disbandment, she returned as a trainee for almost a year before re-debuting as the leader of DIA in September 2015. In April 2016, she left DIA after her contract expired to pursue her acting career. She has established herself as an actress with cast in various television dramas such as Mr. Back (2014), Triangle (2014), The Night Watchman's Journal (2014) and The Producers (2015).

Biography
Cho Yi-hyun was born Cho Seung-hee on June 3, 1991, in Gwangju, South Korea. She currently attends Kookmin University. She is the winner of Miss Chunhyang Pageant in 2012.

She auditioned for both Woollim Entertainment and FNC Entertainment and successfully passed the auditions but ended up choosing Woollim Entertainment for training. In 2012, she appeared on Running Man with Lovelyz's Jiae and The SeeYa's Yeonkyung as "Woollim Girls". She later moved to Core Contents Media and debuted as newest member of F-ve Dolls in 2013.

In July 2020, it was announced by her agency, PocketDol Studio, that Cho had changed her stage name to Cho Yi-hyun.

Career

2013–2015: Career beginnings

In July 2013, Seunghee debuted as the newest member of F-ve Dolls. Aside from her activities group, Seunghee has acted in several television dramas. Her acting career began in 2014 with a cameo role in Mr. Back and Triangle. She also sang the soundtrack for Triangle titled Kiss and Cry alongside T-ara's Jiyeon and Mighty Mouth's Shorry J. She played a minor role on MBC historical drama Diary of a Night Watchman.

In February 2015, Seunghee joined MBK project group, TS with member of T-ara, The SeeYa and SPEED to release winter single "Don't Forget Me". On March 10, MBK Entertainment announced that F-ve Dolls officially disbanded. Seunghee is still being managed by MBK Entertainment. On March 16, it was confirmed that she landed a minor role in KBS drama The Producers. On March 18, MBK Entertainment confirmed that Seunghee would be participating in MBK's upcoming girl group survival show T-ara Little Sister Girl Group. The survival show was later cancelled and MBK Entertainment decided to select the members internally. Seunghee later was chosen as the last member and leader of the group, which debuted in September 2015. From June 9 to 30, she participated in JTBC's Off to School at Goyang International High School.

2016–present: Acting roles
In April 2016, she was confirmed to cast in KBS' drama Unusual Family. It was announced that her contract with MBK Entertainment would soon expire on April 30, but she was still in negotiations to possibly renew her contract. She confirmed her departure from DIA to pursue her acting career after parting ways with MBK Entertainment. She appeared in the dramas Bravo My Life and My First Love.

Discography

Filmography

Drama

References

External links 

 

1991 births
Living people
21st-century South Korean actresses
MBK Entertainment artists
South Korean women pop singers
South Korean television actresses
South Korean film actresses
South Korean female idols
21st-century South Korean singers
21st-century South Korean women singers